John J. Cone (born 1858 – January 1937) was the fourth Supreme Knight of the Knights of Columbus from 1898 to 1899 and Fire Commissioner of Jersey City, New Jersey.

Cone was a founding member of Jersey City Council #137 of the Knights of Columbus on November 3, 1895. In less than three years he was elected Supreme Knight after Supreme Knight Hayes died suddenly from complications from peritonitis.

Knights of Columbus 
During Cone's time in charge, the Knights subscribed to war bonds in order to support the Spanish–American War. He also directed that soldiers and sailors were not to be disqualified from being insurance members. By the end of his time as Supreme Knight the order had reached as far west as the state of Minnesota.

Death 
Cone died at his home in January 1937. He was 79 years old.

References 

Catholics from New Jersey
Deputy Supreme Knights of the Knights of Columbus
People from Jersey City, New Jersey
Supreme Knights of the Knights of Columbus